Avni Cinemax also known as Avni Movies and also Avni Telemedia is an Indian film production and distribution company owned  by Kushboo and her husband Sundar C. The company was named by the starting letter of their daughter's name Avanthika. The company was established in 2004.

History 
Kushboo made her debut as a film producer through the action drama film Giri (2004) directed by her husband Sundar C and featuring Arjun, Reemma Sen and Divya Spandana in the lead roles. The film performed well at the box office, prompting her to carry on as a producer and she next made Rendu, a comedy drama featuring Madhavan in the lead role.

In 2016, a partner group from the parent Avni Groups company called Avni Movies produced the film, Hello Naan Pei Pesuren, with Sundar C being given production credits. The film was however also promoted through Avni Cinemax's official online pages. The same procedure was then followed for Meesaiya Murukku (2017).

Filmography 

Films distributed
In addition to the films produced by Avni Cinemax since 2006, the following films from other banners were distributed by the company:

Veerappu (2007)

Television

References 

Film distributors of India
Film production companies based in Chennai
Indian film studios
2004 establishments in Tamil Nadu
Mass media companies established in 2004
Indian companies established in 2004
Television production companies of Tamil Nadu